Iboyaima Khuman (born 1 March 1953) is a prominent Shumang Kumhei (Courtyard theatre) artist born in Manipur, India. He has been conferred best actor, best director awards in his long journey in Shumang Kumhei, a unique traditional Manipuri Art form not found in any parts of the globe.

Early life
Iboyaima Khuman grew up as a timid and reserved boy since childhood. He did his primary education at Uchekon Takhok Mapal High School and Wangkhei Boys' School and passed Matriculation from Meetei Mayek High School, Kongba.

Awards
 Best Actor Award in the year 1985 in a Shumang Kumhei Imphal Hotel.

Selected Shumang Kumhei plays

 Imphal Hotel
 21st Century gee Kunti-1,2,3,4,5,6
 Gusmo gee Khudol: East Timor
 Restaphen
 Kangleipakta 1703
 Naitom Satpi
 Eyaithakki Thambal (2009)
 Nongallamdaishida
 Yenningthana Ngairi
 Aruba Echel
 Amamba Lambee
 Melody
 Neirehe
 Wakchinggi Nongallamdai
 Huranba Ashingba Natte
 Wahang Ama
 Pabung Hotel gee Tamo
 Sanadagi Kei
 Malemdi Kaihoudre Imungdi Kaire
 Cheikhei Wangma
 Ngaijarakpa Numit
 Lallibasi Kanano
 Thamoigee Makhol (2020)
 Mei Iklaba Thamoi (2021)
 Laklaroi Amuk Yeningtha (2022)

Selected filmography

References

External links
Sumang Kumhei

1953 births
Living people
People from Imphal West district
Meitei people

Shumang Kumhei artists